Raúl Ruiz Pérez (born 14 February 1967) is a Mexican former professional boxer who competed between 1984 and 2000. He is a world champion in two weight classes, having held the WBC bantamweight title from 1988 to 1991 and the WBA super bantamweight title from 1991 to 1992.

Professional career
Known as "Jibaro", Perez turned pro in 1984 with a knockout victory over Jose Alvarado. Before challenging for a world title, he accumulated a record of 61-6-3, with victories over former champion Prudencio Cardona and future champions Gaby Canizales and Wilfredo Vazquez. He lost to Vazquez in a rematch.

WBC bantamweight title
In 1988, Pérez defeated Miguel Lora for the WBC bantamweight title in an extremely bloody fight in which both fighters were cut. He defended the title six times against capable challengers Lucio Omar Lopez, Cardenio Ulloa, Diego Avila, Gerardo Martinez, Jose Valdez, Candelario Carmona, and Gaby Canizales in a rematch. In 1991, he lost his title to Greg Richardson by decision.

WBA super bantamweight title
He moved up in weight later that year to defeat WBA super bantamweight title holder Luis Mendoza by decision. He lost the belt in his first defense by third round tko to Wilfredo Vazquez in a rematch.

Super featherweight and retirement
In 1993, Perez moved up to the Super featherweight division where he unsuccessfully challenged WBA champion Genaro Hernandez, losing by 8th round knockout. He remained inactive for nearly two years, and in 1995, he suffered another knockout loss to Luisito Espinoza. He retired in 2000 after a loss to Hector Velazquez.

Professional boxing record

See also
List of Mexican boxing world champions
List of world bantamweight boxing champions
List of world super-bantamweight boxing champions

References

External links

1967 births
Living people
Mexican male boxers
Boxers from Baja California
Sportspeople from Tijuana
Super-featherweight boxers
World bantamweight boxing champions
World super-bantamweight boxing champions
World Boxing Council champions
World Boxing Association champions
20th-century Mexican people